Airport 24/7: Miami is an American reality television series on the Travel Channel. The series debuted on October 2, 2012. In January 2013, Travel Channel renewed the series for a second season that premiered on April 30, 2013. Travel Channel later green-lit a 6-episode third season.

Premise
Airport 24/7: Miami follows the day-to-day life at Miami International Airport along with the airport's security, border protection and first-responder operations.

Cast
 Albert Cordeschi — Triangle Services Ramp Duty Manager
 Chris "Stretch" Rutledge — Motorcycle Officer for Miami-Dade Police Department
 Darius Bradshaw — Terminal Operations Control Room Agent
 Dickie Davis — Director of Terminal Operations
 Ericka Middleton — Terminal Security Agent
 Heidi Anthony — Terminal Operations Senior Agent
 Ken Pyatt — Deputy Director for Operations
 Lauren Stover — Director of Security
 Tony Cooper — Terminal Operations Senior Agent

Episodes

Season 1 (2012)

Season 2 (2013)

Season 3 (2013)

References

External links
 
 

2010s American reality television series
2012 American television series debuts
2013 American television series endings
English-language television shows
Television shows set in Miami
Aviation television series
Travel Channel original programming
Miami International Airport